Mariano Gomez or Mariano Gómez may refer to:

 Mariano Gomez (priest) (1799-1872), Filipino Catholic priest
 Mariano Gómez (footballer) (born 1999), Spanish footballer